The National Security Branch (NSB) is a service within the Federal Bureau of Investigation. The NSB is responsible for protecting the United States from weapons of mass destruction, acts of terrorism, and foreign intelligence operations and espionage. The NSB accomplishes its mission by investigating national security threats, providing information and analysis to other law enforcement agencies, and developing capabilities to keep the US nation secure.

Leadership

Headed by an FBI Executive Assistant Director, the NSB is responsible to the FBI Director through the Deputy Director. As a unit of the FBI (which is a division of the United States Department of Justice), the NSB is ultimately responsible to the Attorney General of the United States. In addition, the critical role the NSB plays within the United States Intelligence Community places it within the overview of the Director of National Intelligence.

Organization

The FBI created the National Security Branch (NSB) on September 12, 2005 in response to a presidential directive and as a result of the recommendations of the Weapons of Mass Destruction Commission to establish a "National Security Service" that combines the missions, capabilities, and resources of the FBI's counterterrorism, counterintelligence, and intelligence elements under the leadership of a senior FBI official.

The NSB was formed by the unification of the FBI's various national security and intelligence gathering units:
FBI Counterterrorism Division
FBI Counterintelligence Division
FBI Weapons of Mass Destruction Directorate
Terrorist Screening Center
High-Value Detainee Interrogation Group

Future

It is speculated that this will lead to the formation of "career paths" for FBI Special Agents; meaning that once a new agent has completed Special Agent Training at FBI Academy in Quantico, Virginia, and has completed the mandatory probationary period, that he or she can choose to go into the National Security Branch, or go into the "Criminal" part of the Bureau and focus on crimes such as organized crime, narcotics, civil rights violations, fraud, and violent crime. Advocates of this new program say that this re-organization will help the fight against terrorism by making it less bureaucratic.

See also
 United States Department of Justice National Security Division

References

External links
Federal Bureau of Investigation Website
National Security Branch Website

Federal Bureau of Investigation
United States intelligence agencies